Jean Olivia Danker (born 24 September 1978) is a Singaporean radio DJ at Mediacorp's Class 95, a Singapore English radio station, who hosts the  evening show Cartunes on weekdays from 5–8 pm.

She is a Voiceover talent and is also involved in TV production. Her most recent activity was acting in the drama Restless as well as hosting health and beauty shows Body Beautiful and Adventures In Healthcare and family gameshow Look Who’s Leading.

Personal life
Jean Danker was married to Glenn Ong on 16 December 2016, in a seaside solemnisation ceremony at Sofitel Singapore Sentosa Resort & Spa.

References

External links
 Official biography

Living people
Women DJs
Singaporean DJs
Singaporean radio presenters
Singaporean people of European descent
1978 births
21st-century women musicians
Singaporean women radio presenters